Pisco is a province of the Ica Region in Peru. Its capital is the town of Pisco, where the popular liquor of the same name originated.

Geography

Boundaries
 North: Chincha Province, Castrovirreyna Province (Huancavelica Region)
 East: Huaytará Province (Huancavelica Region)
 South: Ica Province
 West: Pacific Ocean

Tourist attractions
One of the main attractions of the province is the Paracas National Reservation, where 216 species of birds have been found. Many beaches attract tourists during the summer months.

The coastal desert area around this reserve is the home of the pre-Inca Paracas culture. This people was known for its elaborate textiles and grave goods, including polychrome shawls made with camelid (llama or alpaca) wool and cotton, which date to 600 BCE.

Political division
The province is divided into eight districts, each of which is headed by a mayor (alcalde):
 Huancano
 Humay
 Independencia
 Paracas
 Pisco
 San Andrés
 San Clemente
 Túpac Amaru Inca

2007 earthquake
With a moment magnitude of 8.0, more than 400 people died and more than 1,500 were injured during the 2007 Peru earthquake. At least 80% of Pisco was damaged.

External links
 Municipalidad Provincial de Pisco – Pisco Province Council official website
 Paracas National Reserve – Information about the national reserve

Provinces of the Ica Region